Vismes is a commune in the Somme department in Hauts-de-France in northern France.

Geography
Vismes is situated 10 miles(16 km) southwest of Abbeville, on the D190 road

History
The chateau of Vismes was built by the seigneurs of Vismes, as documented by Théobald in 1066 (the name of Vismes could then be written with or without the final "s"). The Marquis de Belleval added: "the ruins still stood in the last century". The castle was destroyed by John of Gaunt, 1st Duke of Lancaster in 1372.
The Seigneurie of Vismes passed to the house of Cayeu in the 14th century and then to that of Monchy in the following century, until 1785 when André de Monchy died.

Between 1790 and 1794 Vismes absorbed the hamlets of Morival, Le Plouy and Wiammeville.

Population

See also
Communes of the Somme department

References

Communes of Somme (department)